Brainbombs is a Swedish noise rock band formed 1985 in Hudiksvall. The members are Dan, Peter, Jonas, Drajan, and Lanchy. The latter was also a member of Totalitär. They are notable for their very repetitive, noisy, untuned, raucous sound. Their lyrical themes and concept have been very controversial, as some of the songs depict acts of rape, torture, and murder, similar to the writings of author Peter Sotos, who has been named as an influence for the group. Other artists named as influences for the band include Chrome, James Chance, and Whitehouse, and the group's name comes from a Punishment of Luxury song.

Members 
Current
Peter Råberg - vocals
Jonas Tiljander - guitar
Drajan Bryngelsson - drums
Dan Råberg - trumpet

Past Members 
Lanchy Orre - guitar (1986–2007)

Discography

Studio albums 
Burning Hell LP/CD (1992, Blackjack)
Genius and Brutality... Taste and Power LP/CD (1994, Blackjack)
Obey CD (1995, Releasing Eskimo/Slow Dance)
Urge to Kill CD (1999, Load)
Fucking Mess LP (2008, Lystring)
Disposal of a Dead Body 2xLP (2013, Skrammel)
Souvenirs LP (2016, Skrammel)
Inferno LP (2017, Skrammel)
Cold Case LP (2020, Skrammel)

Singles and EPs 
"Jack the Ripper Lover" 7-inch (1989, self-released)
"Anne Frank" 7-inch (1990, Big Brothel Communications)
"It's a Burning Hell" (1992, Big Ball)
Live Action at ROCK ALL, Oslo live 7-inch (1994, Big Ball)
Anal Babes/Brainbombs split 7-inch (1995, Demolition Derby/Pit'sbull)
"Macht" 7-inch (1999, Gun Court/Wabana)
Cheap 12-inch (2003, Load)
"Stigma of the Ripper" 7-inch (2003, Tumult)
"The Grinder" 7-inch (2004, Ken Rock)
"I Need Speed" 7-inch (2006, Big Brothel Communications)
"Stinking Memory" 7-inch (2007, Anthem)
"Substitute for the Flesh" 7-inch (2009, Burning Hell)

Compilation and live albums 
Brainbombs CD (1999, Load) (Known unofficially as Singles Collection)
Brainbombs CD (2007, Polly Maggoo) (Known unofficially as Singles Collection II)
Live at Smålands Nation, Lund, Sweden, May 29, 1993 LP (2008, Richie)

Other appearances 
 Second Coming from In the Shadow of Death compilation LP (1986, Cold Meat Industry)
 Psychout Kid and I Detta Satans Rum from Unveiled compilation tape (1986, Mechanik Cassettes)
 Turned Around (Chrome cover) from King Kong 3 7-inch (1992, King Kong)
 Time You Left (This World Today) (Hawkwind cover) from Assassins of Silence / Hundred-Watt Violence compilation CD (1995, Ceres Records)

References

External links 
Brainbombs on Facebook
Brainbombs on Discogs
Fan website of Brainbombs

Swedish musical groups
Tumult Records artists
Load Records artists
Musical groups established in 1985
Swedish noise rock groups